The Universal Private Telegraph Company, Limited was formed in 1861 to exploit Professor Charles Wheatstone’s 1858 Universal Telegraph. The company was to "carry out a system by which banks, merchants, public bodies and other parties may have the means of establishing a telegraph for their own private purposes from their houses to their offices, manufactories or other places".

The company's first directors were Charles Wheatstone and William Fairbairn, CE, the Manchester ironmaster. It employed Thomas Page, engineer, Lewis Hertslet, secretary, and Nathaniel Holmes, electrician.

Archives
As a nationalised company, the firm's records are now in the British Telecom Archives.

Stamps
The company issued a number of stamps which are of interest to philatelists and are still some of the most common British telegraph stamps found. It is unclear, however, whether the stamps were ever used as only unused copies are known. The stamps carried the year in the corners.

See also
List of historical British telcos

References

External links
Distant Writing telegraph site.

Telegraph companies of the United Kingdom
1861 establishments in England
Defunct telecommunications companies of the United Kingdom
Telecommunications companies established in 1861
British companies established in 1861